Pool Party Massacre is a 2016 American comedy horror film written, directed, and produced by Drew Marvick.

Plot 
What started as a relaxing summer day by the pool for a group of high-maintenance young socialites quickly becomes a nightmare when an unknown killer begins stalking and murdering them one by one.

Cast
 LeeAnna Vamp as Mrs. Stevens
 Mark Justice as Troy
 Alexis Adams as Tiffany
 John Molinaro as Mr. Winthorpe
 Destiny Faith Nelson as Jasmine
 Drew Marvick as Blaine Winthorpe
 Jenifer Marvick as Kelly
 Paul Card as Ralph
 Kristin Noel McKusick as Blair Winthorpe
 Nick Byer as Clay
 Sally Burnswello as Mrs. Winthorpe
 Trevor Layne as Chet
 Crystal Stoney as Britney
 Dora Deceuninck as Dora
 Jimmy Grosse as Danny

Production 
Marvick intended the film to be a throwback to 80s slasher films. He enlisted the film's shooting director prior to writing the script. The film had a shooting budget of $6,000. Marc Schoenbach was brought on to create the film poster, which Marvick wanted to have the feel of an 80s horror film.

Release 
Pool Party Massacre had its world premiere at FearNYC on October 22, 2016, the festival's inaugural year. This was followed by a release on April 20, 2017.

Reception 
Critical reception has been favorable from horror and pop culture outlets. Rue Morgue wrote a favorable review, praising the practical effects while stating that the movie had issues with its pacing. PopHorror was similarly favorable, as they felt that it was a "fairly standard campy slasher film, but don’t take that to mean that it’s predictable. There are some nice twists and turns along the way, some of which I was able to figure out and some that caught me off guard." A reviewer for the Library Journal was also favorable, writing that "It brought me back to the horror films of the 80's, which was Marvick's intention. Massacre was silly, bloody, and fun—just the way I like it. Stick it next to Friday the 13th and Sleepaway Camp on your shelf immediately. "

Scream magazine was more critical, stating that "Singularly dedicated to delivering a slasher flick in the form of its base elements, Pool Party Massacre is admirable in its commitment to its own simplicity, even if that means it has to bulk up its run-time with excruciatingly tedious characters spewing excruciatingly tedious dialogue."

Sequel 
In 2019 Marvick launched a crowdfunding campaign on IndieGoGo to fund a sequel. He had not initially planned to create a sequel for Pool Party Massacre, "mostly because I never really thought anyone would watch the movie", but began writing one after being approached by fans. The campaign was successfully funded within ten days and Marvick has stated that the film's script has been inspired by sequels such as Slumber Party Massacre II, Return of the Living Dead Part II, and The Texas Chainsaw Massacre 2.

References

External links
 
 

2016 films
American comedy horror films
2016 comedy horror films
2010s English-language films
2010s American films